The Kogi prison break was an attack on Koto-Karffi Federal Medium Security Prisons in Kogi State, in north-central Nigeria by unknown gunmen suspected to be members of the terrorist group, Boko Haram. The attack occurred on 2 November 2014. About 144 prisoners escaped from the prison; 1 inmate was shot and killed during the attack. The escaped prisoners were largely awaiting trial for robbery. Twelve inmates returned to the prison to serve out their sentences and about 45 escaped prisoners were recaptured altogether.

Incident
The incident was reported to have occurred on Sunday, 2 November 2014. The attack was linked with Boko Haram, the Islamic insurgent group operating in northeastern Nigeria. Alhaji Aminu Sule, the comptroller-general of the Nigerian Prisons Services, claimed that the prison break operation was successful as a result of poor funding of the prisons services and that the prison cells had remained unchanged since the prison's establishment in 1934.

See also
Minna prison break
Lagos prison break

References

2014 murders in Nigeria
Terrorist incidents in Nigeria in 2014
Crime in Nigeria
Prison escapes
2014 crimes in Nigeria
Boko Haram attacks
Kogi State
November 2014 events in Nigeria
Escapees from Nigerian detention